Calliophis salitan is a species of venomous snake in the family Elapidae. It is endemic to Dinagat Island in the Philippines. It is unique for its large size as well as its body coloration of a black head & neck with black & white bands along the width of the body, terminating at a bright orange tail. It is distinct from any other coral snake species in the Philippines or Sundas, but is most closely related to the blue coral snakes (C. bivirgatus & C. intestinalis) of the Sunda Shelf. While it is known only from Dinagat Island, it may also occur or have formerly occurred on other islands in the Sulu Archipelago.

References 

salitan
Snakes of Southeast Asia
Reptiles of the Philippines
Endemic fauna of the Philippines
Reptiles described in 2018
Taxa named by Rafe M. Brown
Taxa named by Alan E. Leviton